Diaphorodoris papillata is a species of sea slug, a dorid nudibranch, a shell-less marine gastropod mollusc in the family Calycidorididae.

Distribution
This species was described from Naples, Italy; Villefranche-sur-Mer and Banyuls-sur-Mer, France. It is reported from the Strait of Gibraltar, Spain to Israel. It was reported from Canary Islands in 2016.

Description

The maximum recorded body length is 10 mm.

References

External links
 

Calycidorididae
Gastropods described in 1960